Jim "Big Jim" Mills (born 24 September 1944) is a Welsh former rugby union, and professional rugby league footballer who played in the 1960s, 1970s and 1980s. A Wales and Great Britain international representative , "Big Jim" as he was known, played club rugby in England with Halifax, Salford, Bradford Northern, Widnes (two spells) (with whom he won two Challenge Cups) and Workington Town, and also in Australia for North Sydney. He is the father of former Widnes forward David Mills.

Background
Jim Mills was born in Aberdare on 29 September 1944. He originally played rugby union in Wales with Cardiff before turning professional.

Professional playing career
Mills started playing rugby league in 1965 for English club Halifax. In 1972 he started playing for Widnes. Mills played left-, i.e. number 8, in Widnes' 0-5 defeat by Leigh in the 1972 BBC2 Floodlit Trophy Final during the 1972–73 season at Central Park, Wigan on Tuesday 19 December 1972.

Mills won caps for Great Britain in 1974 against Australia (2 matches) and New Zealand. Mills played left-, i.e. number 8, in Widnes' 2-3 defeat by Bradford Northern in the 1974–75 Player's No.6 Trophy Final at Wilderspool Stadium, Warrington on Saturday 25 January 1975. He played left-, i.e. number 8, and scored a try in Widnes' 14–7 victory over Warrington in the 1975 Challenge Cup Final during the 1974–75 season at Wembley Stadium, London on Saturday 10 May 1975.

After a strong display in Wales' victory over England in the 1975 World Series in Brisbane, Sydney's Manly-Warringah and Canterbury-Bankstown clubs were keen to get the 's signature. Mills was banned for the rest of the season after stomping on John Greengrass' head in the 25–24 win over New Zealand at Swansea in the same tournament. The ban was eventually lifted on 2 January 1976; however, Mills remained banned for life by the New Zealand Rugby League.

Mills played left-, i.e. number 8, in the 16–7 victory over Salford in the 1975 Lancashire County Cup Final during the 1975–76 season at Central Park, Wigan on Saturday 4 October 1975.

He played left- in the 19-13 victory over Hull F.C. in the 1975–76 Player's No.6 Trophy Final during the 1975–76 season at Headingley Rugby Stadium, Leeds on Saturday 24 January 1976. He played left-, i.e. number 8, in Workington Town's 11–16 defeat by Widnes in the 1976 Lancashire Cup Final during the 1976–77 season at Central Park, Wigan on Saturday 30 October 1976, and played left-, i.e. number 8, in Widnes' 15–13 victory over Workington Town in the 1978 Lancashire County Cup Final during the 1978–79 season at Central Park, Wigan on Saturday 7 October 1978.

Mills played right-, i.e. number 10, in the 13-7 victory over St. Helens in the 1978 BBC2 Floodlit Trophy Final during the 1978–79 season at Knowsley Road, St. Helens on Tuesday 12 December 1978.

Mills played  in the 12–3 victory over Wakefield Trinity in the 1979 Challenge Cup Final during the 1978–79 season at Wembley Stadium, London on Saturday 5 May 1979. He played for Great Britain again in 1978 and '79 against Australia.

Mills was selected to play at prop forward for Great Britain in all three Ashes tests of the 1978 Kangaroo tour of Great Britain and France. He also played in Widnes' victory over the touring Australian side. The Open Rugby inaugural World XIII was revealed in June 1978 and included Mills. He played left- in the 16-4 victory over Warrington in the 1978–79 John Player Trophy Final at Knowsley Road, St. Helens on Saturday 28 April 1979, and played as an interchange/substitute (replacing  Brian Hogan) in the 0-6 defeat by Bradford Northern in the 1979–80 John Player Trophy Final at Headingley Rugby Stadium, Leeds on Saturday 5 January 1980.

Post-playing
Mills was also one of the original thirteen former Widnes players inducted into the Widnes Hall of Fame in 1992. That year he also worked as team manager for the Welsh national team. Jim Mills is the father of the rugby league footballer; David Mills.

References

External links
!Great Britain Statistics at englandrl.co.uk (statistics currently missing due to not having appeared for both Great Britain, and England)
Statistics at rugby.widnes.tv
Hall Of Fame at rugby.widnes.tv
(archived by web.archive.org) Jim Mills at eraofthebiff.com
(archived by web.archive.org) Jim Mills at yesterdayshero.com.au
(archived by web.archive.org) Jim Mills at stats.rleague.com
Welsh convert XIII
Statistics at cardiffrfc.com

1944 births
Living people
Bradford Bulls players
Cardiff RFC players
Footballers who switched code
Great Britain national rugby league team players
Halifax R.L.F.C. players
North Sydney Bears players
Other Nationalities rugby league team players
People from Grangetown, Cardiff
Rugby league players from Aberdare
Rugby league props
Rugby union players from Aberdare
Salford Red Devils players
Wales national rugby league team players
Welsh rugby league players
Welsh rugby union players
Widnes Vikings players
Workington Town players